The lesser omentum (small omentum or gastrohepatic omentum) is the double layer of peritoneum that extends from the liver to the lesser curvature of the stomach, and to the first part of the duodenum. The lesser omentum is usually divided into these two connecting parts: the hepatogastric ligament, and the hepatoduodenal ligament.

Structure 

The lesser omentum is extremely thin, and is continuous with the two layers of peritoneum which cover respectively the antero-superior and postero-inferior surfaces of the stomach and first part of the duodenum.

When these two layers reach the lesser curvature of the stomach and the upper border of the duodenum, they join and ascend as a double fold to the porta hepatis.

To the left of the porta, the fold is attached to the bottom of the fossa for the ductus venosus, along which it is carried to the diaphragm, where the two layers separate to embrace the end of the esophagus.

At the right border of the lesser omentum, the two layers are continuous, and form a free margin which constitutes the anterior boundary of the omental foramen.

Divisions 
Anatomically, the lesser omentum is divided into ligaments, each starting with the prefix "hepato" to indicate that it connects to the liver at one end.

Most sources divide it into two parts:
 hepatogastric ligament: the portion connecting to the lesser curvature of the stomach
 hepatoduodenal ligament: the portion connecting to the duodenum

In some cases, the following ligaments are considered part of the lesser omentum:
 hepatophrenic ligament: the portion connecting to the thoracic diaphragm
 hepatoesophageal ligament: the portion connecting to the esophagus
 hepatocolic ligament: the portion connecting to the colon

Contents 
Between the two layers of the lesser omentum, close to the right free margin, are the hepatic artery proper, the common bile duct, the portal vein, lymphatics, and the hepatic plexus of nerves—all these structures being enclosed in a fibrous capsule (Glisson's capsule).

Between the layers of the lesser omentum, where they are attached to the stomach, run the right and left gastric arteries, as well as the gastric veins.

Additional images

See also
 Omental bursa (Lesser sac)
 Greater sac
 Omental foramen (Epiploic foramen, Foramen of Winslow)

References

External links
 
 
 
  - "The stomach and lesser omentum."
  - "Abdominal Cavity: The Lesser Omentum"
  - "Stomach, Spleen and Liver: Contents of the Hepatoduodenal Ligament"
 
 
 

Abdomen